The following list of the reptiles of Iowa lists all of the snakes, turtles, and lizards that are known to occur in the US state of Iowa.

Lizards
There are five species of lizards in Iowa.

Snakes
There are 27 species of snakes in Iowa.

Turtles
There are 13 species of turtle in Iowa.

See also
 List of amphibians of Iowa

References

External links
Reptiles and Amphibians of Iowa

Reptiles
Iowa